Joseph Martin Boland (September 7, 1904 – February 26, 1960) was an American football player and coach and sports broadcaster. He played on the 1924 Notre Dame Fighting Irish football team coached by Knute Rockne.  Boland also served as the head football coach at the University of St. Thomas in St. Paul, Minnesota from 1929 to 1932. He also served as the offensive line coach at his alma mater, the University of Notre Dame from 1934 to 1940 under the head coach of Elmer Layden.  After his coaching career, he conceived and started the Irish Football Network becoming the first voice of Notre Dame, as well as calling the Chicago Cardinals games of the National Football League.

Gallery

References

1960 deaths
Sportspeople from Philadelphia
American television sports announcers
Notre Dame Fighting Irish football announcers
Notre Dame Fighting Irish football players
Notre Dame Fighting Irish football coaches
St. Thomas (Minnesota) Tommies football coaches
St. Thomas (Minnesota) Tommies men's ice hockey coaches
1904 births
Players of American football from Philadelphia